Yaacov Shavit (born 24 October 1944) is an emeritus professor at the Department of Jewish History, Tel Aviv University. His main fields of study are the history of modern Israel and modern Jewish intellectual and cultural history. Shavit has also written about the Afrocentrism movement in the African American community. He is married to Zohar Shavit.

Published works
1987, The New Hebrew Nation: A Study in Israeli Heresy and Fantasy, Routledge, .
1988, Jabotinsky and the Revisionist Movement, 1925-1948, Routledge, .
1997, with  Chaya Naor, Niki Werner, Athens in Jerusalem: Classical Antiquity and Hellenism in the Making of the Modern Secular Jew, Oxford (Paperback edition, 1999, Taylor & Francis).
2001,  History in Black: African Americans in Search of an Ancient Past, London., Routledge, .
2006, with Jehuda Reinharz, Glorious, Accursed Europe: An Essay on the Jews, Europe and Western Culture, .
2007, with Chaya Naor and Mordechai Eran, The Hebrew Bible Reborn: From Holy Scripture to the Book of Books, Berlin, Walter de Gruyter,  .

References

External links

From One God to Sun God, Yaacov Shavit, Haaretz

Living people
Historians of Jews and Judaism
Historians of Israel
Academic staff of Tel Aviv University
1944 births